The 1993 RTHK Top 10 Gold Songs Awards was held in 1993 for the 1992 music season.

Top 10 song awards
The top 10 songs (十大中文金曲) of 1993 are as follows.

Other awards

References
 RTHK top 10 gold song awards 1993

RTHK Top 10 Gold Songs Awards
Rthk Top 10 Gold Songs Awards, 1993
Rthk Top 10 Gold Songs Awards, 1993